"Evil Roy" is a single by R&B/funk band Earth, Wind & Fire issued in 1988 by Columbia Records. The song rose to No. 22 on the Billboard Hot R&B/Hip-Hop Singles & Tracks chart and No. 38 on the Billboard Dance Club Songs chart.

Overview 
"Evil Roy" was produced by EWF bandleader Maurice White and composed by Philip Bailey, Attala Zane Giles and Allee Willis. The song came off the band's 1987 studio album Touch the World.

A music video was issued in 1988 to accompany the single.

Critical reception
David Emerson of The Boston Globe described "Evil Roy" as having "a menacing bass line".

Personnel
 Maurice White: lead vocals, background vocals
 Philip Bailey: songwriter, lead vocals, background vocals
 Allee Willis: songwriter
 Attala Zane Giles: songwriter, producer, synthesized bass, synthesizer, synth arranger, guitar, percussion programming, background vocals
 Sheldon Reynolds: guitar
 Rhett Lawrence: Fairlight CMI programming, sequencing, drum programming

Chart positions

References

1988 singles
Earth, Wind & Fire songs
Songs written by Philip Bailey
Songs written by Allee Willis
1988 songs
Columbia Records singles